Hawthorne Village is a suburban community in Milton, Ontario which was established by Mattamy Homes in 1999. Hawthorne Village has been the best selling community in the Greater Toronto Area for the last 5 years (2007), and presently houses over 3500 families. In 2002 Hawthorne Village was awarded "Project of the Year" by the Ontario Home Builders Association and "Community of the Year" by the Greater Toronto Homebuilders Association.

History
Dramatic evidence that Milton was in for a period of growth and change came with the construction of the first new homes in the subdivision built by Mattamy that was called Hawthorne Village. This and other growth was fueled in 1999 by 15.5 km of new water main from the Upper Middle Road Reservoir, colloquially known as the big pipe, and sewage lines to Oakville, Ontario treatment facilities.

Prior to this the last subdivision developments in the urban area had been registered 25 years earlier.
In 2001 about 1,600 building permits were issued and growth was evident. Recently the  Sherwood survey has been approved for the south west side of the town with provision for 12,000 more homes and about 35,000 people. A Third Phase, known as the Boyne Survey is expected to be developed in about 15 years.

Construction
Besides conventional on-site construction, Mattamy Homes uses prefabrication for many of the houses in Hawthorne Village. 

Unlike other prefab modular builders, which build the house in sections and then ship the pieces to the site for assembly, these Mattamy houses come off the line in one piece with their interior (cabinetry, light fixtures, electrical and plumbing systems) completed. Mattamy currently utilizes a private road between their prefab facility and the housing development, which avoids the hassles of using a public road which would require traffic disruptions and police escorts. While indoor construction is currently more expensive than building on-site, Mattamy's prefab process is 70 days shorter than on-site construction, as the shelter from weather eliminates uncertainties and creates a safer and better quality environment.

The Stelumar Advanced Manufacturing plant, located at Tremaine Road south of Derry Road, can produce a new house in eleven days, and accommodate up to ten homes in various stages of progress at any one time. Every day, the moving production line shifts each house to the next work station. The Stelumar facility is expected to operate for four years, producing 220 homes a year, after which Mattamy will disassemble and move the plant to a new development.

Notes

References
 https://web.archive.org/web/20070928180922/http://www.milton.ca/townwide/anniversary_Changing_Ways_05.pdf

Neighbourhoods in Milton, Ontario